Eni Llazani (born 30 November 1989 in Shkoder) is an Albanian professional basketball player who currently plays for BC Vllaznia in the Albanian Albanian Basketball League.

References

1989 births
Living people
Albanian men's basketball players
Basketball players from Shkodër
Point guards